Gauhar Jamil (born Ganesh Nath; c. 1925 – 21 September 1980) was a Bangladeshi dancer.

Career
Jamil took dance lessons from Uday Shankar, Sharbashree Maruthappa Pillai, Bal Keshta Menon, Ramnarayan Mitra, and Bhaskar Dev.

Jamil taught dance lessons at Shilapakala Bhavan, Bulbul Lalitakala Academy, and Qamrunnessa School. Jamil married Rawshan Jamil in 1952. In 1959 they founded a dance school  Jago Art Centre.

References 

1920s births
1980 deaths
Bangladeshi male dancers
Recipients of the Ekushey Padak
Road incident deaths in Bangladesh
Modern dancers